The fire of Skopje started on 26 October 1689 and lasted for two days, burning much of the city; only some stone-built structures, such as the fortress and some churches and mosques, were relatively undamaged. The fire had a disastrous effect on the city: its population declined from around 60,000 to around 10,000, and it lost its regional importance as a trading centre. Many of them settled in the imperial capital, creating the Üsküp mahallesi (Turkish for "Skopje neighborhood").

In 1689 the Austrian general Enea Silvio Piccolomini led an army to capture Kosovo, Bosnia and Macedonia from the Ottoman Empire.

In the same time, successful development of Skopje was suddenly interrupted in 1689 by the entry of the Austrian army into Macedonia. During the Austrian-Turkish war (1683-1699), Austrian troops under the command of General Piccolomini penetrated in an unstoppable advance far into the interior of European Turkey and, after taking the fortress of Kaçanik, descended into the Skopje plain. On 25 October 1689, they took Skopje without much struggle, for the Turkish army and the inhabitants had left the town. By order of General Piccolomini, Skopje was set on fire, and the conflagration lasted two days (26 and 27 October); great many houses and shops were destroyed, but the worst damage was in the Jewish quarter of the town, where almost all the dwelling-houses, two synagogues and the Jewish school were destroyed.

During the Skopje offensive, General Piccolomini contracted and died from cholera.

Some accounts of these events state that Piccolomini razed Skopje due to an inability of his forces to occupy and govern a city so far from his headquarters.

Buildings damaged by the fire 

 Kapan Han
 Skopje clock tower
 İshak Bey Mosque
 Yahya Pasha Mosque
 Sultan Murad Mosque and its medrese
 Suli An
 Kursumli An
 Skopje Bedesten
 Arasta Mosque
 Church of the Ascension of Jesus

References

External links
Дневник, 25.10.2008: „317 години од пожарот што го збриша градот“ 
„Денот што го турна Скопје во двовековен мрак“, „Нова Македонија“, 24.10.2009 

Great Turkish War
Fire of 1689
Urban fires in Europe
1689 in the Ottoman Empire
1689 in Europe
1689 disasters
Skopje